The Panther 6 was a British six-wheel convertible produced by Panther in 1977. The car is powered by a mid-mounted  Cadillac V8 engine with twin turbochargers paired to a three-speed automatic transmission. Only two cars were made (one in white, one in black), both of which are known still to exist. One is in Saudi Arabia, and the other was shown at the 2008 NEC Classic Car Show by the Panther Car Club and at the 2015 Concorso d'Eleganza Villa d'Este by Albert Fellner.

The six-wheel configuration was inspired by the Tyrrell P34 racing car. The layout consists of one pair of larger rear wheels with Pirelli 265/50VR16 tyres, and two pairs of smaller steerable front wheels with Pirelli 205/40VR13 tyres.

The specification included a detachable hard top and convertible soft top, electronic instruments, air conditioning, an automatic fire extinguisher, electric seats and windows, a telephone and a dashboard-mounted television set.

See also

Twin front axle 
 Covini C6W
 FAB 1 (fictional car)
 Ford Seattle-ite XXI (concept car)
 Tyrrell P34
 Bedford VAL (Bus and Coach versions)

Twin rear axle 
 Ferrari 312T6
 March 2-4-0

References
The Observer's Book of Automobiles Frederick Warne & Co (1978)

External links
Panther 6 and interview Bob Jankel
Lengthy article on Panther 6 with image
Article on the Panther 6 with photo

6
Sports cars
Luxury vehicles
Six-wheeled vehicles
Cars introduced in 1977